Hajjiabad (also Romanized as Ḩājjīābād; also known as Ḩājīābād-e Yūjān, Ḩājjīābād-e Yūjān, and Qal‘eh Now) is a village in Salehan Rural District, in the Central District of Khomeyn County, Markazi Province, Iran. At the 2006 census, its population was 40, in 11 families.

References 

Populated places in Khomeyn County